The San Francisco Marathon is an annual USATF-certified road running event held in San Francisco, California, that includes a full marathon, two half marathons, an ultramarathon, a 10k, and a 5K. With the exceptions of 1988 and 2020, the marathon has been held annually since 1977. The marathon starts and finishes on the Embarcadero near the Ferry Building and crosses the Golden Gate Bridge.  It is a qualifying race for the Boston Marathon.

History 

The first San Francisco Marathon was organized by the Pamakids Runners Club. Athol Barton, a taxicab driver who at the time lived in Reno, Nevada won the inaugural on July 10, 1977 in a time of 2:24:59. Athol was born in Aotearoa New Zealand and was of NZ Maori and Scottish descent.  Fewer than 900 ran this inaugural race. The event's all-time record for marathon finishers came in 1983 with 7,231. An estimated 7,800 runners participated in the various events in 2004 and 11,290 in 2005. This number had increased to approximately 19,000 in 2008 and 21,000 in 2009 The 2009 event was hosted by ultramarathoner Dean Karnazes and Runner's World columnist Bart Yasso.

In 2005, 356 of the 4,873 finishers qualified for Boston. Of the 4,021 finishers in 2006, 277 qualified. 2010's race produced 462 qualifiers, 468 runners qualified in 2011, 377 qualified in 2012, and 2016's race produced 296 qualifiers. 2018's race produced 324 Boston Marathon qualifiers.

The purse has also varied from year to year. In 1977, Barton took home a t-shirt for his efforts. When Pete Pfitzinger won in 1986, he earned $5,000 and a new car. Although many top runners were attracted to the $35,000 purse that was offered in 1998 ($10,000 for first place, $5,000 for second place, $2,500 for third place), no prize money was offered from 1999 through 2001. From 2002 to 2004, $10,000 was divided among the winners. Prize money has not been offered since 2005, primarily due to lack of large sponsors.

The 2020 in-person edition of the race was cancelled due to the COVID-19 pandemic, with all registrants given the option of running the race virtually, or transferring their entry to 2021 for a US$39 fee. The 2021 race will be held on September 18-19th, 2021.

Course 
The current marathon course forms a loop that starts and finishes on the Embarcadero near the Ferry Building.  The course runs past many notable landmarks in San Francisco including Fisherman's Wharf, Aquatic Park, the Golden Gate Bridge, Golden Gate Park, and AT&T Park. The course briefly enters Marin County at the northern end of the Golden Gate Bridge.

The marathon course has undergone a number of changes since its inception. In the late 1980s, the start was moved from Marin County to San Francisco. In 1999, race organizers made a number of changes to make the course faster. That year the course was altered to start and end near the Polo Fields in Golden Gate Park and the run across the Golden Gate Bridge was eliminated. Previous routes have taken the marathon along the Great Highway. In 2002, the start/finish at Golden Gate Park was moved to the Embarcadero with a run across the Golden Gate Bridge.

The first half marathon originally crossed the Golden Gate Bridge along the full marathon, but was eliminated in 2018 due to security and safety concerns. Previously, the full marathon and first half marathon ran on the roadbed of the bridge, shutting down automobile traffic for two lanes.

In popular culture 

In 2002, the San Francisco Marathon was the fictionalized backdrop for an episode of Monk entitled "Mr. Monk and the Marathon Man."

Winners

 CR = course record since the addition of the Golden Gate Bridge out and back

NOTE:  Due to World Athletics policies, the 2019 win by Zarina is legally listed as an Authorised Neutral Athlete because of policies related to Doping in Russia.

Notes

References

External links 

 San Francisco Marathon official website
 Committed 2 Community - producer of the San Francisco Marathon
 San Francisco Marathon Weather History

Foot races in California
Marathons in California
Marathons in the United States
Recurring sporting events established in 1977
Sports competitions in San Francisco
Annual sporting events in the United States
1977 establishments in California